Bolshiye Kaybitsy is a village in the Republic of Tatarstan in Russia. It is the administrative center of Kaybitsky District in Tatarstan.

Geography 
Bolshiye Kaybitsy is located in southwestern Tatarstan,  from Kazan. The village spans both banks of the river Birla River, a tributary of the Sviyaga River.

Population 
The population of Bolshiye Kaybitsy in several different years:
1989: 942
1997: 1409
2010: 1600

History 
The village was established in the time of the Khanate of Kazan.

Until 1920, village was in the lyankovskuyu Sviazhsky Uyezd of Kazan Governorate. The area underwent several administrative changes until the Kaybitsky District was established on April 19, 1991.

In 2005 and 2006, a road bypassing Bolshiye Kaybitsy was built, decreasing traffic through the village. Bus transportation to Kazan and the Zelenodolsk Kulanga station from Bolshiye Kaybitsy is, however, still possible.

Notes 

Rural localities in Kaybitsky District
Sviyazhsky Uyezd